The Woodstown-Pilesgrove Regional School District is a comprehensive regional public school district serving students in pre-kindergarten through twelfth grade form five communities in Salem County, New Jersey, United States. The district serves students from Woodstown and Pilesgrove Township for K-12, along with students from neighboring Alloway Township, Oldmans Township and Upper Pittsgrove Township who attend the district's high school as part of sending/receiving relationships. A majority of public school students in grades 9-12 from Oldmans Township attend Penns Grove High School as part of a sending/receiving relationship with the Penns Grove-Carneys Point Regional School District, with the balance attending Woodstown High School.

As of the 2020–21 school year, the district, comprised of four schools, had an enrollment of 1,425 students and 126.5 classroom teachers (on an FTE basis), for a student–teacher ratio of 11.3:1.

The district is classified by the New Jersey Department of Education as being in District Factor Group "FG", the fourth-highest of eight groupings. District Factor Groups organize districts statewide to allow comparison by common socioeconomic characteristics of the local districts. From lowest socioeconomic status to highest, the categories are A, B, CD, DE, FG, GH, I and J.

Schools 
Schools in the district (with 2020–21 enrollment data from the National Center for Education Statistics) are:
Elementary schools
William Roper Early Childhood Learning Center with 83 students in grades PreK-K
Diane Cioffi, Principal
Mary S. Shoemaker Elementary School with 470 students in grades 1-5
Diane Cioffi, Principal
Middle school
Woodstown Middle School with 278 students in grades 6-8
Allison Pessolano, Principal
High school
Woodstown High School with 579 students in grades 9-12
Richard Senor, Principal

Administration
Core members of the district's administration are:
Virginia Grossman, Superintendent of Schools
Rose Chin, School Business Administrator / Board Secretary

Board of education
The district's board of education, comprised of 11 members, sets policy and oversees the fiscal and educational operation of the district through its administration. As a Type II school district, nine members of the board's trustees are elected directly by voters to serve three-year terms of office on a staggered basis, with three seats up for election each year held (since 2012) as part of the November general election. The board appoints a superintendent to oversee the district's day-to-day operations and a business administrator to supervise the business functions of the district. Seats on the board of education are allocated based on the population of the constituent districts, with five seats assigned to Pilesgrove and for to Woodstown; the sending districts of Alloway Township and Upper Pittsgrove Township each send a member designated by the board of education of the sending district.

References

External links 
Woodstown-Pilesgrove Regional School District

Data for the Woodstown-Pilesgrove Regional School District, National Center for Education Statistics

New Jersey District Factor Group FG
School districts in Salem County, New Jersey
Pilesgrove Township, New Jersey
Woodstown, New Jersey